Kshitij Patel (born 15 October 1997) is an Indian cricketer. He made his Twenty20 debut for Gujarat in the 2017–18 Zonal T20 League on 7 January 2018. He made his first-class debut on 19 January 2020, for Gujarat in the 2019–20 Ranji Trophy.

References

External links
 

1997 births
Living people
Indian cricketers
Gujarat cricketers
Place of birth missing (living people)